Ulric Oduma Emmanuel Jones (11 December 1940 - 9 September 2020) was a Sierra Leonean medical doctor who was the first Sierra Leonean to specialize as neurosurgeon. Jones was the medical director of the Fajara Medical Clinic in the Gambia.

Early life
Jones was born in Freetown, Sierra Leone on 11 December 1940 to Teddy Jones, a prominent  Creole civil servant, and Hannah Jones, née Davies. The Jones family included members such as Dr Radcliffe Dougan Jones, the well-known Sierra Leonean medical doctor.

Education and medical studies
Jones was educated at the Sierra Leone Grammar School where he was head-boy. Jones subsequently studied and qualified as a medical doctor at the University of Edinburgh and studied neurosurgery in Japan in the 1970s.

Family life
Ulric Jones married Doreen Leigh in 1961 and the couple had four children.

Death
Jones died on 9 September 2020 in Freetown, Sierra Leone.

References
https://allafrica.com/stories/202009140250.html
https://www.researchgate.net/publication/5758167_The_development_of_neurosurgery_at_the_National_Hospital_for_Neurology_and_Neurosurgery_Queen_Square_London_England
https://www.researchgate.net/publication/11460103_History_and_State_of_Neurosurgery_in_Austria

Sierra Leone Creole people
Sierra Leonean expatriates in the United Kingdom
Sierra Leonean surgeons
Sierra Leonean neurosurgeons
1940 births
2020 deaths
Sierra Leonean expatriates in the Gambia
Sierra Leonean expatriates in Japan
People from Freetown